Pentedrone (also known as α-methylaminovalerophenone) is a stimulant of the cathinone class that has been sold as a designer drug and has been found since 2010 as an ingredient in a number of "bath salt" mixes sold as legal highs.

Pharmacology

Pentedrone acts as a norepinephrine-dopamine reuptake inhibitor without causing their release, the same mechanism of action as methylphenidate.

Side effects

Pentedrone has been linked to at least one death where it was combined with α-PVP and caused heart failure.

Detection
A forensic standard of Pentedrone is available, and the compound has been posted on the Forendex website of potential drugs of abuse.

Legal status
On January 28, 2014, the DEA listed it, along with nine other synthetic cathinones, on the Schedule 1 with a temporary ban, effective February 27, 2014.

Pentedrone is an Anlage II controlled drug in Germany.

As of October 2015 Pentedrone is a controlled substance in China.

Pentedrone is banned in the Czech Republic.

See also 
 4-Methylpentedrone
 Buphedrone
 MDPV
 Methcathinone
 Pentylone
 Substituted cathinone

References 

Cathinones
Designer drugs
Norepinephrine–dopamine reuptake inhibitors